High Hell is a 1958 American film set in the Canadian Rockies. It was a British B-movie intended for North American audiences, with exteriors filmed in the Swiss Jungfrau and interiors on a British sound stage.

Plot
Craig Rhodes and Frank Davidson are partners in a gold mine in Canada. Frank's wife Lenore falls for Craig and is lusted after by Luke Fulgham.

Cast
 John Derek as Craig Rhodes 
 Elaine Stewart as Lenore Davidson
 Patrick Allen as Luke Fulgham
 Jerold Wells as Charlie Spence
 Al Mulock as Frank Davidson
 Rodney Burke as Danny Rhodes
 Colin Croft as Malvern, mine financier
 Nicholas Stuart as Jed, mob leader
 Dick James as Singer (voice)

References

External links

1958 films
Films directed by Burt Balaban
1950s English-language films